The Nimble 20, is an American trailerable sailboat that was designed by Edward S. Brewer as a pocket cruiser and first built in 1986.

Production
The design was built by Nimble Boats in the United States from 1986 until about 1991, but it is now out of production.

Design
The Nimble 20 is a recreational keelboat, built predominantly of fiberglass, with wood trim. It has a fractional ketch rig, a canoe hull, a rounded plumb stem, an angled transom, a transom-hung rudder controlled by a tiller and a fixed stub keel keel with a retractable centerboard. It displaces  and carries  of ballast.

The boat is normally fitted with a small well-mounted  outboard motor for docking and maneuvering.

The design has sleeping accommodation for four people, with a double "V"-berth in the bow cabin and two straight settees in the main cabin. The head is located in the bow cabin on the starboard side.

Operational history
In a 2010 review Steve Henkel wrote, "...you can sail in strong winds without the main, under jib and 'jigger' (ie., the mizzen). You can control any tendency of the boat to dance around her mooring by hoisting the mizzen alone. You can sometimes balance the helm of an otherwise finicky boat by fine-tuning the mizzen sheet along with the centerboard ... Best features: Her traditional looks appeal to us ... Worst features: Her PHRF is at the high end, indicating that her overall speed potential is below that of her comp[etitor]s, despite her high-end [hull speed] due to her long waterline. Her speed performance under sail compared to comp[etitor]s is probably a result of a combination of small sail area, split rig, and her hard chine bull shape, which tends to pound a bit in a chop."

See also
List of sailing boat types

References

External links
Photo of a Nimble 20
Video: Launching Nimble 20

Keelboats
1980s sailboat type designs
Sailing yachts
Trailer sailers
Sailboat type designs by Edward S. Brewer
Sailboat types built by Nimble Boats